Mark Ian Price, Baron Price  (born 2 March 1961) is a British businessman, Founder of WorkL for Business and WorkL, Chairman of Fair Trade UK,  writer, President of the Chartered Management Institute and member of the House of Lords.  He was a former Managing Director of Waitrose, and Deputy Chairman of the John Lewis Partnership. He joined the Conservative government as the Minister of State for Trade and Investment in April 2016.

On 3 September 2017 it was announced that Price would leave the government; on 28 September Rona Fairhead was appointed to succeed him.

Early life
Price was born and grew up in Crewe, England. His father was a corner shop owner, later a wholesaler, and an evangelical preacher. He attended Crewe County Grammar School for Boys.

In 1982 Price graduated from Lancaster University with a 2:1 BA degree in Archaeology.

In 1984 Price married Jane Platt at Christchurch Priory in Dorset

Career
He started his career at the John Lewis Partnership as a graduate trainee in 1982, before progressing to become John Lewis store manager in High Wycombe and Cheadle.  In 2005, he joined the John Lewis Partnership Board taking on responsibility for strategy as Development Director. In April 2007, the then Managing Director Steven Esom left the Partnership, and Price was appointed as his replacement. At the time Waitrose had 183 stores, and within six years this number had increased to 300.

In 2013 it was announced that in addition to his position at Waitrose he would become Deputy Chairman of the John Lewis Partnership, replacing David Barclay who had held the position since 2006.

In October 2015 Price announced he was to leave the John Lewis Partnership in April 2016 after 10 years fulfilling the role of Managing Director of Waitrose. Suggestions have been made saying that Mark may apply for the chairman position of Channel 4.

In February 2016 it was announced that Price would become the new Minister of State for Trade, after the resignation of Lord Maude of Horsham, and that he would be made a life peer. On 29 February, he was created Lord Price, of Sturminster Newton in the County of Dorset. He left the Government in September 2017.

Since 2018 Price has been on the Council at Lancaster University and Chair of Fairtrade UK .  

Price has sat on Coca-Cola Europe's board since 2019.  

Price became President of the Chartered management institute in September 2020.

In October 2017, Price founded Engaging Business  and WorkL, digital platforms designed to make the world a little happier and help businesses increase employee retention by measuring, tracking and improving organisations' workplace happiness; it offers happiness surveys and career development opportunities for individuals and businesses.

Other work
Price has served as Chairman of Business in the Community since 2011 and The Prince's Countryside Fund since 2010. He sits on the Board of Directors of Channel 4 and the Consumer Goods Forum. He was appointed Commander of the Royal Victorian Order (CVO) in the 2014 New Year Honours for his work with Business in the Community and The Prince's Countryside Fund. Price is also a Life Patron at GroceryAid.

Price has written a number of books on employee engagement including 'Six Steps to Workplace Happiness' and 'Fairness for All'.  Price has written a book to help children learn to play chess called The Foolish King.  The Foolish King  website helps children learn how to play chess in a fun and exciting way.

Personal life
In 1991 Price married Judith Bolt in the London Borough of Richmond upon Thames. They live in Sturminster Newton with their two girls.

References

External links
 Waitrose

Audio clips
 Interview on 11 June 2011 on The Bottom Line
 Interview on 26 July 2010 on You and Yours

Video clips
 BITC in March 2011

1961 births
Living people
Alumni of Lancaster University
Alumni of Bowland College, Lancaster
British retail chief executives
Channel 4 people
Commanders of the Royal Victorian Order
Conservative Party (UK) life peers
John Lewis Partnership people
People educated at Ruskin High School, Crewe
People from Crewe
Waitrose
Life peers created by Elizabeth II